The Royal River Conservation Trust (abbreviated RRCT) is a volunteer-run conservation group based in Yarmouth, Maine, United States. Established in 1988 and funded by its members, it owns many preserves and trail networks, and has assisted in the creation of town-owned parks and preserves, state parks and state wildlife-management areas. The trust covers seven towns and cities in Androscoggin County and Cumberland County which form the watershed of the Royal River: Yarmouth, North Yarmouth, Pownal, New Gloucester, Gray, Durham and Auburn.

The trust's executive director is Alan Stearns, while its president is Emily Sneath Jones.

History 
The trust was formed as a result of a group named the Friends of the Royal River and land trusts in Yarmouth, Pownal, North Yarmouth and New Gloucester.

Properties 

 Big Falls Preserve
 Bradbury–Pineland Corridor and Elmwood Trails
 Chandler Brook Preserve
 Chandler Mill Pond and Little Hill and Snows Hill
 Collyer Brook
 Cousins River Fields and Marsh Project
 Cousins River Marsh and Watershed
 Dunn's Depot Trail
 Fels–Grove Farm Preserve
 Fern Hollow Preserve
 Flowing North Preserve
 Granite Falls Preserve
 Intervale Preserve
 Knight's Pond Preserve
 Lanes Island
 Libby Hill Trails
 Littlejohn Island Preserve
 Long Hill Road Preserve
 Maine Wildlife Park
 Maine Woodland Owners
 Mayall Mills State Historic Site
 Mèmak Preserve
 Morgan Meadows Wildlife Management Area
 Old Harris Road Preserve
 Old Town House Park
 Pisgah Hill Preserve
 Riverfront Woods Preserve
 Runaround Pond and Chesley Meadows Preserve
 Shaker Village & Bog
 Sam Ristich Trails
 Skyline Farm
 Spear Farm Estuary Preserve
 Thayer Brook Preserve
 Thoits Branch Headwaters Preserve
 Thurston Wildlife Marsh
 Westcustogo Park
 West Side Trail

See also
 List of environmental and conservation organizations in the United States

References

External links 
 

Organizations established in 1988
Nature conservation organizations based in the United States
Environmental organizations based in the United States
Non-profit organizations based in Maine
1988 establishments in Maine
Yarmouth, Maine